Nierras is a surname. Notable people with the surname include:

 Ernest Nierras, Filipino football head coach
 Samantha Nierras (born 1989), Filipino footballer